The Comedy Arts Theater of Charlotte, often abbreviated as CATCh, is an improv theater located in the Lower Southend (LoSo) neighborhood of Charlotte, North Carolina, United States. The theater teaches and hosts performances of improvisational theatre. It was founded in 2016 by Abigail Head and Kevin Shimko. CATCh focuses primarily on longform improv, and teaches a patient, character-driven, and theatrical style of scene work.

History 
CATCh opened its first permanent venue at 4200 South Blvd in Charlotte on February 8, 2019.

References

External links

2016 establishments in the United States
Improvisational troupes
Theatres in Charlotte, North Carolina